Coursan is a commune in the Aude department in southern France. Coursan station has rail connections to Narbonne, Béziers and Montpellier.

It is 7 km from Narbonne on the river Aude. There is a bridge built in the fifteenth century, over which passes the RN9 road. The town has a church from the same period which is in the course of being restored.

Composer Henry Fourès was born in Coursan (17 May 1948)

Population

See also
Communes of the Aude department
List of medieval bridges in France

References

External links

 Official site

Communes of Aude
Aude communes articles needing translation from French Wikipedia